Lepine is a hamlet in Hoodoo No. 401, Saskatchewan, Canada. Its two abandoned elevators are popular with photographers.

See also

 List of communities in Saskatchewan
 Hamlets of Saskatchewan

References

External links

Hoodoo No. 401, Saskatchewan
Unincorporated communities in Saskatchewan
Division No. 15, Saskatchewan